Culham railway station serves the village of Culham in Oxfordshire, England. It is served by local train services provided by Great Western Railway.

The station is just off the A415 road, between the villages of Culham and Clifton Hampden.

It is close to Culham Science Centre, an  scientific research site housing two nuclear fusion experiments: JET and MAST. The Science Centre was built on the site of RNAS Culham (HMS Hornbill), a World War II airfield.

History
The Great Western Railway opened the station on the  –  line as Abingdon Road on 12 June 1844.

The original station building (no longer in railway use) is in the Tudor Revival architecture of Isambard Kingdom Brunel and is a Grade II* listed building.

In some recent years passenger numbers using Culham have changed rapidly. The total increased 67% in the three years 2006–09, but then decreased slightly in 2010.

Services

The service from here is irregular outside of weekday peak periods, with sizeable gaps between calls in both directions. On weekdays there are 13 trains per day northbound towards Oxford and 12 towards Didcot with 8 each way on a Saturday. No trains call at Culham on Sundays.

References

External links

Railway stations in Oxfordshire
DfT Category F1 stations
Former Great Western Railway stations
Railway stations in Great Britain opened in 1844
Railway stations served by Great Western Railway
Grade II* listed buildings in Oxfordshire
Grade II* listed railway stations
Isambard Kingdom Brunel railway stations